The 2010 Ondrej Nepela Memorial was the 18th edition of an annual senior-level international figure skating competition held in Slovakia. It was held between September 30 and October 2, 2010 at the Vladimír Dzurilla Ice Rink in Bratislava. Skaters competed in the disciplines of men's singles, ladies' singles, and ice dancing.

Results

Men

Ladies

Ice dancing

External links
 announcement
 2010 Ondrej Nepela Memorial results

Ondrej Nepela Memorial
Ondrej Nepela Memorial, 2010